Kursath is a town and a nagar panchayat in Hardoi district in the Indian state of Uttar Pradesh. It has ten wards named: Jawahar Nagar, Azad Nagar, Gauri Nagar, Pant Nagar, Rajendra Nagar, Patel Nagar, Gandhi Nagar, Subhash Nagar, Ram Nagar and Ashok Nagar.

Demographics
 India census, Kursath had a population of 5,654. Males constitute 54% of the population and females 46%. Kursath has an average literacy rate of 62%, higher than the national average of 59.5%: male literacy is 70%, and female literacy is 53%. In Kursath, 17% of the population is under 6 years of age.

References

Cities and towns in Hardoi district